Jonas Romanovas (born 4 August 1957) is a Lithuanian cyclist. He competed in the men's individual road race at the 1996 Summer Olympics.

References

External links
 

1957 births
Living people
Lithuanian male cyclists
Olympic cyclists of Lithuania
Cyclists at the 1996 Summer Olympics
People from Klaipėda County